Jacobite consorts are those who were married to a Jacobite pretender to the thrones of England, Scotland and Ireland since the abdication of James II in 1688. By Jacobites they are thus regarded, if female, as rightful Queens Consort of England, Scotland and Ireland. Since the death of Marie-Jenke, Duchess of Bavaria in 1983, there has been no Jacobite consort; the current pretender, Franz, Duke of Bavaria, is not married.

After 1807, the succession passed from the House of Stuart, and none of the Jacobite heirs since has actually claimed the thrones of England and Scotland or incorporated the arms of England and Scotland in their coats-of-arms.

Henry Benedict Stuart (pretender 1788-1807, as Henry IX & I) and Franz, Duke of Bavaria (pretender 1996–present, as Francis II) never married (Henry was a Catholic priest, bishop, and cardinal). Marie Clotilde of France, wife of Charles Emmanuel IV of Sardinia (pretender 1807-1819, as Charles IV), died before her husband became pretender, as did Duchess Marie Gabrielle in Bavaria, first wife of Rupprecht, Crown Prince of Bavaria (Robert I & IV).

See also
 Jacobite succession
 List of Sardinian consorts
 List of Dukes of Modena and Reggio
 List of Modenese consorts
 List of rulers of Bavaria
 List of Bavarian consorts
 Family tree showing the ancestry of the Jacobite Pretenders and their relation to the UK monarchs descended from Sophia of Hanover

Consorts
Jacobites
Jacobites
Jacobites